Eucalyptus badjensis, commonly known as the Big Badja gum, is a tree that is endemic to south-eastern New South Wales. It has hard, rough bark on the lower part of the trunk, smooth grey bark above, often hanging in strips on the upper branches, linear to narrow lance-shaped, often curved adult leaves, green to yellow buds in groups of three in leaf axils, white flowers and conical or bell-shaped fruit.

Description
The upper bark is often shed in ribbons. They are the same dull green colour on both surfaces. Flowering occurs in January and the flowers are white.

Taxonomy and naming
Eucalyptus badjensis was first formally described in 1924 by Wilfred de Beuzeville and  Marcus Welch "at an elevation of about 4,000 feet, three miles south of the Big Badja Mountain". The description was published in Journal and Proceedings of the Royal Society of New South Wales. The specific epithet (badjensis) is a reference to the distribution of this eucalypt. The ending -ensis is a Latin suffix "denoting place, locality [or] country".

Distribution and habitat
Big Badja gum is found in wet forest, on hills and plateaus on the eastern side of the Southern Tablelands in New South Wales. It grows in soils that are relatively fertile and where the rainfall is high and occurs from Big Badja Hill to Cathcart and Brown Mountain, west of Bega.

References 

badjensis
Myrtales of Australia
Flora of New South Wales
Plants described in 1924